The Philadelphia Tigers were a Negro league baseball team that played briefly in the 1928 Eastern Colored League (ECL) before the circuit disbanded in early June.  The Tigers, organized by Smittie Lucas, featured a few well-known east coast players, such as Bill Yancey, George Johnson, and McKinley Downs, but no real stars.

They played at Pencoyd Field, which was near Wissahickon station in the Manayunk neighborhood of Philadelphia.

After the ECL fell apart, the Tigers struggled on as a marginal independent team into July before disbanding.

References

The Negro Leagues Book edited by Dick Clark & Larry Lester {1994} Publisher: The Society for American Baseball Research (Cleveland OH) 
The Biographical Encyclopedia of the Negro Baseball Leagues  by James A. Riley {1994} Publisher: Carroll & Graf (New York NY) 

Negro league baseball teams
Defunct baseball teams in Pennsylvania
Baseball teams disestablished in 1928
Baseball teams established in 1928
Sports teams in Philadelphia